Gui de Ceriz (+ap.1369), Lord of Ceriz. was a French aristocrat who served as  Great Master of France (1343. Heraldics):

De Ceriz supervised the Royal House of the King of France.  His heraldic shield contained two red sceptres with a royal crown on top

Notes 

Lords of France
Grand Masters of France